Karpurigram railway station is a railway station on Samastipur–Muzaffarpur line under the Sonpur railway division of the East Central Railway zone. The railway station is situated beside State Highway 49 at Karpurigram in Samastipur district of the Indian state of Bihar.

References

Railway stations in Samastipur district
Sonpur railway division